Como Bluff is a long ridge extending east–west, located between the towns of Rock River and Medicine Bow, Wyoming. The ridge is an anticline, formed as a result of compressional geological folding. Three geological formations, the Sundance, the Morrison, and the Cloverly Formations, containing fossil remains from the Late Jurassic of the Mesozoic Era are exposed. 

Nineteenth-century paleontologists discovered many well-preserved specimens of dinosaurs, as well as mammals, turtles, crocodilians, and fish from the Morrison Formation. Because of this, Como Bluff is considered to be one of the major sites for the early discovery of dinosaur remains. Among the species discovered is the only known specimen of Coelurus.  Significant discoveries were made in 22 different areas scattered along the entire length of the ridge. It is included on the National Register of Historic Places as well as the National Natural Landmark list.

History of discovery 

The discovery of dinosaurs at Como Bluff has been recounted numerous times, most notably by Schuchert and LeVene, Shur, Ostrom and McIntosh, and Jaffe. Most of the specimens were collected by men working for O.C. Marsh between 1877 and 1889, although some were collected by the Hubbel brothers for E.D. Cope between 1879 and 1880. The American Museum of Natural History (AMNH) excavated in 1897 -1898 , finding two partial skeletons of sauropods. A summary of the quarries and their contents is given below.

In later years, the American Museum of Natural History and Yale University jointly reopened Quarry 9, the Mammal Quarry, 1968–1970, finding only a few specimens. More recently, Robert Bakker has done some collecting there with a variety of groups.

In addition to the major significance of dinosaur discoveries at Como Bluff, the site has also been the source of significant early mammal fossils.  In early 1878, Marsh was ecstatic to find that one of his men had uncovered a fossil from a Jurassic mammal.  Within a year, the historic Quarry 9 at Como was discovered, producing an astounding 250 specimens, which increased the knowledge of Jurassic mammals exponentially.

Como Bluff historical quarries (pre-1900) 
Data source:.
 
.
. 
(h)= holotype

AMNH Quarries
Excavated by the American Museum of Natural History

AMNH Quarry 1
Dinosauria
Saurischia
Sauropoda
Diplodocus sp

AMNH Quarry 2
Dinosauria
Saurischia
Sauropoda
Brontosaurus excelsus
Camarasaurus sp,

AMNH localities unknown 
(some could be from Quarry 1 or 2)
Reptilia
Testudines
Amphichelydia
Glyptops plicatus
Squamata
?Sauria indeterminant
Lacertilia
Paramacellodus sp.
Choristodera
Cteniogenys antiquus
Crocodilia
Mesosuchia
Goniopholis sp.

Frederick Brown's Quarries

Brown's Quarry A
Dinosauria
Ornithischia
Stegosauria
Stegosaurus sp.

Brown's Quarry B
Dinosauria
Ornithischia
Stegosauria
Stegosaurus sp.

Brown's Quarry C
Dinosauria
Saurischia
Theropoda
Allosaurus fragilis

Brown's Quarry D
Dinosauria
Saurischia
Theropoda
Allosaurus fragilis

Brown's Quarry G
Dinosauria
Saurischia
Sauropoda
Camarasaurus sp.

Arthur Lakes Quarry 1A. (Big Canyon Quarry)
Excavated by Arthur Lakes.
Dinosauria
Saurischia
Theropoda
Allosaurus sp.
Sauropoda
Camarasaurus sp.
Ornithischia
Ornithopoda
Camptosaurus amplus (h) (now Allosaurus sp.)

E.D. Cope's Quarries
Excavated by Edward Drinker Cope

Cope's Quarry 3
Dinosauria
Saurischia
Theropoda
Allosaurus sp.

Cope's Quarry 4
Dinosauria
Saurischia
Theropoda
Allosaurus sp.
Ornithischia
Stegosauria
Stegosaurus sp.

Cope's Quarry 5
Reptilia
Pterosauria
Dermodactylus montanus
Dinosauria
Saurischia
Sauropoda
Apatosaurus sp.

Cope's localities unknown 
(could be from Quarry 1, 2)
Reptilia
Testudines
Amphichelydia
Dinochelys sp.
Glyptops plicatus
Crocodilia
Mesosuchia
Goniopholis sp.
Dinosauria
Ornithischia
Ornithopoda
?Camptosaurus sp.
Stegosauria
Stegosaurus sp.
Mammalia
genus and species indeterminant

William Harlow Reed's Quarries
Excavated by William Harlow Reed.

Reed's Quarry 1
Dinosauria
Saurischia
Theropoda
Allosaurus atrox (h) (now Allosaurus fragilis)
Sauropoda
Camarasaurus grandis (h)
Camarasaurus impar (h) (now Camarasaurus grandis)
Camarasaurus robustus (h) (now Camarasaurus grandis)
Pleurocoelus montanus (h) (now Camarasaurus grandis)
Diplodocus sp.
Mammalia
genus and species indeterminant

Reed's Quarry 1 ½
Dinosauria
Saurischia
Theropoda
Allosaurus fragilis
Sauropoda
genus and species indeterminant

Reed's Quarry 2
Dinosauria
Saurischia
Sauropoda
Apatosaurus sp.

Reed's Quarry 3
Dinosauria
Saurischia
Theropoda
Allosaurus lucaris (h) (now Allosaurus sp.)
Sauropoda
Camarasaurus grandis
Ornithischia
Ornithopoda
Dryosaurus sp.
Stegosauria
Stegosaurus sp.

Reed's Quarry 4
Dinosauria
Saurischia
Theropoda
Allosaurus fragilis
Sauropoda
Apatosaurus sp.
Barosaurus sp.
Camarasaurus sp.
Ornithischia
Stegosauria
Stegosaurus sp.

Reed's Quarry 5
Reptilia
Pterosauria
Dermodactylus montanus (h) (now nomen dubium)
Dinosauria
Saurischia
Sauropoda
Diplodocus sp.
Ornithischia
Ornithopoda
Dryosaurus altus (h)

Reed's Quarry 6
Reptilia
Crocodylia
Mesosuchia
Goniopholis sp.

Reed's Quarry 7 (Three Trees Quarry)
Dinosauria 
Ornithischia
Ornithopoda
Laosaurus consors (h) (now Othnielosaurus consors)

Reed's Quarry 8
Reptilia
Testudines
genus and species indeterminant
Crocodilia
Mesosuchia
Goniopholis sp.
Dinosauria
Saurischia
Theropoda
Allosaurus sp.
Coelurus fragilis
Sauropoda
Camarasaurus sp.
Diplodocus sp.
Ornithischia
Stegosauria
Stegosaurus sp.

Reed's Quarry 9 (Mammal Quarry)
Osteichthyes
Actinopterygii
genus and species indeterminant
Amiiformes
Ophiopsis sp.
Sarcopterygii
Dipnoi
Ceratodus guentheri
Amphibia
Anura
Comobatrachus aenigmatis
Discoglossoidea
Enneabatrachus hechti
Pelobatidae indeterminant
Pipoidea?
Eobatrachus agilis (h)
Caudata
genus and species indeterminant
Comonecturoides marshi (h)
Reptilia
Testudines
Amphichelydia
Dinochelys whitei
Glyptops ornatus
Squamata
?Sauria indeterminant
Lacertilia
Dorsetisaurus sp.
Paramacellodus sp.
Rhynchocephalia
Opisthias rarus (h)
Theretairus antiquus (h)
Choristodera
Cteniogenys antiquus (h)
Crocodylia
Sphenosuchia
Macelognathus vagans (h)
Mesosuchia
Goniopholis sp.
Dinosauria
Saurischia
Theropoda
Allosaurus fragilis
Ceratosaurus nasicornis
Coelurus fragilis
Ornitholestes hermanni?
Tyrannosauroidea
Stokesosaurus clevelandi?
Sauropoda
Macronaria indeterminant
Diplodocidae indeterminant
Ornithischia
Ornithopoda
Othnielosaurus consors
Dryosaurus sp.
Camptosaurus sp.
Stegosauria
Stegosaurus sp.
Pterosauria
Rhamphorhynchoidea
Laopteryx priscus (h) (now nomen dubium)
Mammalia
Docodonta
Docodontidae
Docodon affinis (h)
Docodon crassus (h)
Docodon striatus (h)
Docodon superus (h)
Docodon victor (h)
Multituberculata
Allodontidae
Ctenacodon laticeps (h)
Ctenacodon scindens (h)
Ctenacodon serratus (h)
Psalodon fortis (h)
Psalodon potens (h)
?Psalodon marshi (h)
Triconodonta
Amphilestidae
Aploconodon comoensis (h)
Comodon gidleyi (h)
Triconodontidae
Priacodon ferox (h)
Priacodon grandaevus (h)
Priacodon lulli (h)
Priacodon robustus (h)
Trioracodon bisulcus (h)
Symmetrodonta
Amphidontidae
Amphidon superstes (h)
Tinodontidae
Tinodon bellus (h)
Eurylambda aequicrurius
Dryolestida
Dryolestidae
Amblotherium gracilis (h)
Dryolestes priscus
Dryolestes obtusus (h)
Dryolestes vorax (h)
Laolestes eminens (h)
Laolestes (Melanodon) goodrichi (h)
Laolestes (Melanodon) oweni (h)
Miccylotyrans minimus (h)
Paurodontidae
Araeodon intermissus (h)
Archaeotrigon brevimaxillus (h)
Archaeotrigon distagmus (h)
Comotherium richi (h)
Euthlastus cordiformis (h)
Paurodon valens (h)
Tathiodon agilis (h)

Reed's Quarry 10
Dinosauria
Saurischia
Sauropoda
Brontosaurus excelsus (h)

Reed's Quarry 11
Dinosauria
Saurischia
Sauropoda
Apatosaurus amplus (h) (now Brontosaurus excelsus)
Ornithischia
Stegosauria
Stegosaurus duplex (h) (now Stegosaurus ungulatus)
Mammalia
genus and species indeterminant

Reed's Quarry 12 (Robbers' Roost Quarry)
Reptilia
Testudines
genus and species indeterminant
Crocodylia
Mesosuchia
Goniopholis sp.
Dinosauria
Saurischia
Theropoda
Allosaurus sp.
Torvosaurus tanneri
Coelurus sp.
Fosterovenator churei
Sauropoda
Camarasaurus sp.
Diplodocus sp.
Ornithischia
ornithopoda
genus and species indeterminant
Stegosauria
Stegosaurus ungulatus (h)

Reed's Quarry 13
Reptilia
Testudines
Amphichelydia
Glyptops plicatulus
Crocodylia
Mesosuchia
Goniopholis sp.
Dinosauria
Saurischia
Theropoda
Coelurus agilis (h) (part of Coelurus fragilis holotype)
Coelurus fragilis (h)
Saurischia
Sauropoda
?Brachiosaurus sp.
Camarasaurus lentus (h)
Diplodocus sp.
Ornithischia
Ornithopoda
Camptonotus dispar (h) (now Camptosaurus dispar)
Camptosaurus medius (h)
Camptosaurus nanus (h)
Camptosaurus browni (h)
Dryosaurus sp.
Stegosauria
Diracodon laticeps (h) (now Stegosaurus sp.)
Stegosaurus sulcatus (h)
Stegosaurus stenops
Stegosaurus ungulatus

Reed Quarry 14
Dinosauria
Saurischia
Theropoda
Allosaurus ferox (h) (now Allosaurus fragilis)

See also 
 List of fossil sites (with link directory)

References

External links

Como Bluffs fossil quarries
Como Bluff at the Wyoming State Historic Preservation Office
Dinosaur Fossil Cabin Museum

Ridges of Wyoming
Landforms of Albany County, Wyoming
Landforms of Carbon County, Wyoming
Jurassic geology of Wyoming
Morrison Formation
Paleontology in Wyoming
National Natural Landmarks in Wyoming
Natural features on the National Register of Historic Places in Wyoming
1970s in paleontology
National Register of Historic Places in Albany County, Wyoming